"Love, You Ain't Seen the Last of Me" is a song written by Kendal Franceschi, and first recorded by American country music artist and actor Mac Davis on his 1982 album Forty 82.  It was more successfully covered by American country music artist and actor John Schneider in April 1987 as the first single from his album You Ain't Seen the Last of Me.  The song reached number 6 on the Billboard Hot Country Singles & Tracks chart.

The song was again covered by Tracy Byrd on his 1999 album It's About Time. It was released as the album's second single in April 2000 and peaked at number 44 on the Billboard Hot Country Singles & Tracks chart.

Chart performance

John Schneider

Tracy Byrd

References

1987 singles
2000 singles
Mac Davis songs
John Schneider (screen actor) songs
Tracy Byrd songs
Song recordings produced by Jimmy Bowen
Song recordings produced by Billy Joe Walker Jr.
MCA Records singles
RCA Records singles
1982 songs
Songs written by Kendal Franceschi